Jake Ngapera Webster (born 29 October 1983) is a New Zealand international rugby league footballer who plays as a  for the Keighley Cougars in Betfred League 1.

Webster also played for the Bradford Bulls in the Championship.

Early life
Webster was born in Melbourne, Victoria, Australia. He is the son of a New Zealand Māori father, Steven and Greek mother, Madeline, spent the early years of his life in Moonee Ponds before moving to Brisbane, Queensland with his father. When in Brisbane, Jake was educated at Wavell State High School. Jake also played football in primary school at Stafford state school in Brisbane's north alongside former Queensland sprinter and beenliegh lions and brothers Junior speedster Craig Stevens. 

He began his rugby league career as an eight-year-old with the Valleys rugby league club and remained with the club through to under-18s. Jake was first spotted by former Melbourne Storm assistant coach Anthony Griffin in 2000 and was offered a place with Storm feeder side, Norths Devils.

Playing career

National Rugby League
In 2001 Webster was selected in the Queensland under-19s side and was offered a Storm contract soon after. He was the first Melbourne-born player to play with the Melbourne Storm. In round 16, 2006, he scored a memorable try that saved the Storm from certain defeat in one of the games of the year.
  
Webster signed for the Gold Coast Titans in 2006 and is a member of their inaugural season, in 2007. He was selected to play for the New Zealand national team on the wing in the 2007 ANZAC Test loss against Australia.

Webster agreed a deal to join current English Super League side Hull Kingston Rovers on 30 August 2007 for a reported 3 year £100,000 per year contract after being released by the Titans.

Super League
Webster made his Super League début in a 20-12 defeat by Leeds Rhinos in which he scored a brace and Hull Kingston Rovers' only tries. Jake made a good start to the 2010 season filling in for Paul Cooke at stand off and scoring a try in the opening fixture against Salford City Reds.

On 26 June Webster signed for Castleford Tigers on a three-year deal, starting in 2013. 

In March 2014, after missing rugby league action for nearly 12 months out with injury, Webster was given game time to play for the York City Knights in the League 1 competition. Later in 2014, Webster helped Castleford reach their first Challenge Cup Final since 1992. He was a key player in the squad that achieved this, and scored a try against Widnes in the Semi-Final. He played in the 2014 Challenge Cup Final defeat by the Leeds Rhinos at Wembley Stadium.

Webster scored 4 tries against Wakefield Trinity in August 2017 to seal Castleford's place at the top of Super League, helping the club achieve their first ever top-flight league title. He also played for the Tigers in the Grand Final in the same season. 

Webster's departure from Castleford was announced in August 2018. Throughout his time with the club, Webster was regarded as a fans' favourite, stating "The biggest memory from my time here at Castleford will be the fans in the stands."

Lower leagues
In August 2018, Webster signed for Bradford Bulls on a two-year deal. At the end of the 2019 season and having scored 11 tries in 25 appearances for the Bulls, Webster left the club part way through his contract to join League 1 neighbours Keighley Cougars on a two-year deal.

References

External links
Castleford Tigers profile
Hull KR profile
SL profile

1983 births
Living people
Australian rugby league players
Australian people of Greek descent
Australian people of Māori descent
Bradford Bulls players
Castleford Tigers players
Gold Coast Titans players
Hull Kingston Rovers players
Keighley Cougars players
Melbourne Storm players
New Zealand Māori rugby league players
New Zealand national rugby league team players
Rugby league wingers
Rugby league centres
Rugby league players from Melbourne
Rugby league players from Brisbane